Regulus is a 1744 tragedy by the British writer William Havard. It portrays the career of Marcus Atilius Regulus, a Roman Consul at the time of the First Punic War. It ran for seven performances during the season.

The original Drury Lane cast included David Garrick as Regulus, Havard himself as Decius, Dennis Delane as Corvus, William Mills as Metullus, Edward Berry as Manlius, James Taswell as Attilus Regulus, Edward Woodburn as Emelius, Anne Budgell as Clelia and Anna Marcella Giffard as Martia.

References

Bibliography
 Baines, Paul & Ferarro, Julian & Rogers, Pat. The Wiley-Blackwell Encyclopedia of Eighteenth-Century Writers and Writing, 1660-1789. Wiley-Blackwell, 2011.
 Highfill, Philip H, Burnim, Kalman A. & Langhans, Edward A. A Biographical Dictionary of Actors, Actresses, Musicians, Dancers, Managers, and Other Stage Personnel in London, 1660-1800: Garrick to Gyngell. SIU Press, 1978.

1744 plays
Plays by William Havard
Tragedy plays
West End plays
Phoenicia in fiction